Rafael Jauregui (born December 20, 2004) is an American soccer player who plays as a midfielder for Sacramento Republic in the USL Championship.

Career

Sacramento Republic
In July 2020, Jauregui signed a USL Academy contract with the club. He made his league debut for the club on July 20, 2020, coming on as an 89th-minute substitute for Dariusz Formella in a 1–0 home victory over Reno 1868.

Personal life
Born in the United States, Jauregui is of Mexican descent.

References

External links
Rafael Jauregui at US Soccer Development Academy

2004 births
Living people
Sacramento Republic FC players
USL Championship players
American soccer players
Association football midfielders
Soccer players from California
People from Rancho Cordova, California
United States men's youth international soccer players